Crucifixion is an ancient method of execution.

Crucifixion may also refer to:
 The Crucifixion or crucifixion of Jesus, a first-century AD event central to the founding and beliefs of Christianity

Music
"Crucify" (song), a 1992 song by Tori Amos from Little Earthquakes
"Crucified" (Army of Lovers song) (1991)
"Crucified" (Bella & Filippa song) (2017)
"Crucifixion" (song), a 1966 song by Phil Ochs from Pleasures of the Harbor
"Crucified" (Sevendust song) (2001)
"The Crucifixion" (Stainer), an 1887 Passion cantata or oratorio by John Stainer
"Crucifixion" or "He Never Said a Mumblin' Word", a spiritual song
"Crucifixion", a song from the 1971 rock opera Jesus Christ Superstar by Andrew Lloyd Webber and Tim Rice
"Crucified", a 1996 song by Accept from Predator
"Crucified", a 2010 song by Disturbed from Asylum
"Crucified", a 2015 song by Venom from From the Very Depths
"Crucified", a 2017 song by Eighteen Visions from XVIII

Paintings
Crucifixion (Antonello da Messina), any of three 15th-century paintings by Antonello da Messina
Crucifixion (Bellini), a 15th-century painting by Giovanni Bellini
Crucifixion (Francis Bacon, 1965), a 1965 triptych painting by Francis Bacon
The Crucifixion (Cranach), a 1532 painting by Lucas Cranach the Elder
Crucifixion (Corpus Hypercubus), a 1954 painting by Salvador Dalí
The Crucifixion (Gérôme), a 1867 painting by Jean-Léon Gérôme
Crucifixion (Heemskerck), 1543 painting by Maarten van Heemskerck
Crucifixion (Nabil Kanso), a 1983 painting by Nabil Kanso
Crucifixion (Mantegna), a 1450s painting by Andrea Mantegna
Crucifixion (Masaccio), a 1426 painting by Masaccio
Crucifixion (Modena), a 1375 painting by Barnaba da Modena
The Crucifixion (Pavias), a 15th-century painting by Andreas Pavias
Crucifixion, seen from the Cross, an 1880s painting by James Tissot
Crucifixion (Titian), a 1558 painting by Titian
Crucifixion Diptych (van der Weyden), a 1460s two-panel painting by Rogier van der Weyden
Crucifixion (van Dyck), a 1630 painting by Anthony van Dyck
Crucifixion (van Eyck), a 15th-century drawing attributed to Jan van Eyck
Crucifixion (after van Eyck?), a c. 1440-50 painting usually attributed to the workshop of Jan van Eyck

Other uses
The Crucifixion (film), a 2017 horror film by Xavier Gens

See also
 Christ Crucified (disambiguation)
Crucifixion between Sts. Jerome and Christopher, a 1480s painting by Pinturicchio
Crucifixion in the arts
Crucifixion With a Donor (Bosch), a 1480s painting by Hieronymus Bosch
Crucifixion with Pietà (Lotto), 1530 painting by Lorenzo Lotto